Gymnopilus aurantiophyllus is a species of mushroom-forming fungus in the family Hymenogastraceae.

Description

Habitat and distribution
Gymnopilus aurantiophyllus has been found growing in clumps on sawdust, in Oregon, in November.

See also

 List of Gymnopilus species

References

aurantiophyllus
Fungi described in 1969
Fungi of North America
Taxa named by Lexemuel Ray Hesler